The Indiana Railway Museum is a railroad museum located in French Lick, Indiana, United States, dedicated to preserving and displaying artifacts related to the history of railroads in Indiana.

History
The Indiana Railway Museum was founded in 1961 in the Decatur County town of Westport with one locomotive and three passenger cars. The museum relocated to Greensburg and then in 1978 to its present location in French Lick after the Southern Railway deeded a total of sixteen miles of right of way stretching from West Baden, Indiana, approximately one mile north of French
Lick, to a small village named Dubois, to the south.

Collection
The museum's collection includes more than 65 pieces of rolling stock and locomotives.  The museum has three steam locomotives on display that are not operational and three operational diesel locomotives.  Excursions are typically powered by a diesel locomotive. Usually, the train consists of an ALCO RS-1 or EMD GP16 pulling 3 ex Chicago and North Western Railroad bi-level commuter cars, a concession car, 4 ex Rock Island passenger cars, an ex Northern Pacific Budd dome car, and an ex Illinois Central caboose.

Locomotive Roster 

IRM #4 - ALCO RS-1 - Ex Algers, Winslow and Western Railway #4, Built as Duluth, South Shore and Atlantic #103

IRM #6 - GE 80 Ton - Ex US Navy #65-00356

IRM #78 - ALCO S-2 - Ex Michigan Southern #78

IRM #97 - Baldwin 2-6-0 - Built as Mobile and Gulf #97

IRM 101 - ALCO S-4 - Ex Algers, Winslow and Western Railway #1

IRM 208 - Baldwin 2-6-0, built as Angelina and Neches River Railroad #208

IRM 1813 - EMD GP16 - Ex INRD 1813, built as Seaboard Air Line #1810

Rail line
The museum owns 16 miles of an ex-Southern Railway and Monon line running from West Baden Springs in Orange County, through French Lick, then southwest to the towns of Cuzco and Dubois in Dubois County.

The track beyond Dubois is operated by the Dubois County Railroad, a for-profit subsidiary of the museum. The line interchanges with Norfolk Southern at Huntingburg.

Excursions
The museum operates the 10-mile stretch of the line between French Lick and Gradman as a heritage railroad known as French Lick Scenic Railway.

Excursions are based on a 20-mile round trip through portions of the scenic Hoosier National Forest and the 2200 foot Burton Tunnel and takes approximately 2 hours.

On occasion, the museum runs a train called the "Spirit of Jasper" in cooperation with the City of Jasper. The train operates out of the rebuilt Jasper train depot, and sometimes runs to French Lick with the "Jasper to French Lick Express".

See also
List of heritage railroads in the United States
List of museums in Indiana

References

External links
French Lick Scenic Railway - operated by the Indiana Railway Museum
Bureau of Transportation Statistics: Freight Railroads Operating in Indiana by Class (2000)
Indiana Society of Professional Land Surveyors: Railroad List

Railroad museums in Indiana
Former Monon Railroad stations
Heritage railroads in Indiana
Museums in Dubois County, Indiana
Museums in Orange County, Indiana